Kypärämäki (literal English translation: helmet hill) is a neighbourhood of Jyväskylä, Finland. There are 3150 inhabitants in Kypärämäki. Kypärämäki includes the areas Kypärärinne, Kypärätie, Köhniö, Köhniönranta and Killeri. Most of the houses in Kypärämäki were built in 1940's or 1950's.

Gallery

References

External links

Kypärämäki-Köhniö citizens association 
Kypärämäki Music School

Neighbourhoods of Jyväskylä
Rally Finland